Neil David Dewsnip is an English football coach who is Technical Director of Plymouth Argyle.

Dewsnip had been a youth player at Liverpool and later worked as a teacher at a number of schools before becoming a coach. He worked with Everton's Academy for 17 years before beginning work with the England national youth teams in 2013, leaving that role in 2019 to join Plymouth Argyle.

Early and personal life
Dewsnip was born in Whiston.

His father Jim worked as a coach at Liverpool under manager Bill Shankly.

Playing and teaching career
Dewsnip was a youth player at Liverpool. His father "realised that he would not make the grade as a professional and so he steered him towards the academic route". Dewsnip trained as a PE teacher, attending the Carnegie College of Physical Education for four years, which later became part of Leeds Beckett University.

He began his teaching career in 1983 at Broad Oak High School in Bury, teaching there for a year-and-a-half. He later taught at New Heys Comprehensive School, where two of his former pupils, Karl Robinson and Jim Bentley, would later become managers in the Football League.  He also taught at Cardinal Heenan Catholic High School in Liverpool, and taught future professional footballer Steven Gerrard.

Coaching career
Dewsnip worked at the Everton Academy for 17 years, leaving in July 2013 to work for the Football Association, initially as the technical lead for the England under-17 to under-21 teams.  He was working as the under-18 team manager by September 2014.  Whilst still under-18 manager, he managed the under-17 team at the 2015 FIFA U-17 World Cup following the departure of John Peacock. Whilst still the under-18 manager, he also managed the under-20s at the 2017 Toulon Tournament.

In August 2019 he became Technical Director of Plymouth Argyle.

In August 2021 Dewsnip was part of the backroom coaching and mentoring team for the Canada women's team that won Gold at the Tokyo 2020 Olympics.

References

Date of birth missing (living people)
Living people
English footballers
Liverpool F.C. players
Schoolteachers from Merseyside
English football managers
Everton F.C. non-playing staff
Association footballers not categorized by position
People from Whiston, Merseyside
Year of birth missing (living people)
Plymouth Argyle F.C. non-playing staff
Association football coaches